Chime is the fourth studio album by Dessa, a member of Minneapolis indie hip hop collective Doomtree. It was released by Doomtree Records on February 23, 2018.

Reception
Chime peaked at 139 on the Billboard 200 chart.

Track listing
Credits adapted from liner notes.

All lyrics written by Dessa.

Personnel
Credits adapted from liner notes.
 Dessa – vocals, lyrics, recording on "Half of You"
 Andy Thompson – engineer, recording on all tracks except "Half of You", executive production
 Lazerbeak – executive production
 Bruce Templeton – mastering
 Joe Mabbott – mixing on all tracks except "Good Grief"
 Lance Conrad – mixing on "Good Grief"
 Andy Lund – design, layout
 Bill Phelps – photography

Charts

References

External links
 

2018 albums
Dessa albums
Doomtree Records albums
Albums produced by Lazerbeak